The 4th New Brunswick Legislative Assembly represented New Brunswick between February 8, 1803, and 1809.

The assembly sat at the pleasure of the Governor of New Brunswick Thomas Carleton. Carleton left the province in 1805 and the colony was governed by a series of colonial administrators after his departure.

Amos Botsford was chosen as speaker for the house.

History

Members 

Notes:

References 
Journal of the votes and proceedings of the House of Assembly of ... New-Brunswick from ... February to ... March, 1803 (1803)

04
1803 in Canada
1804 in Canada
1805 in Canada
1806 in Canada
1807 in Canada
1808 in Canada
1809 in Canada
1802 establishments in New Brunswick
1809 disestablishments in New Brunswick